Trachyleberididae is a family of ostracods belonging to the order Podocopida.

Genera

Genera:
 Abrocythereis Gou, 1983
 Abyssocythere Benson, 1971
 Abyssophilos Jellinek & Swanson, 2003

References

Ostracods